Javier Portillo may refer to:

Javier Portillo (Honduran footballer) (born 1981), Honduran football left midfielder
Javier Portillo (Spanish footballer) (born 1982), Spanish football forward